Karenus Kristofer Thinn (19 December 1850 – 24 March 1942) was a Norwegian judge.

He was born in Østre Toten. From 1891 he was a presiding judge (lagmann) in Hålogaland, Borgarting and Agder. In 1902 he was appointed extraordinary Supreme Court assessor. From 1909 to 1920 he served as its tenth Chief Justice.

References

1850 births
1942 deaths
Chief justices of Norway
People from Østre Toten